Robin Bain (born February 12, 1980) is an American actress, writer and director.

Career

Early work
Robin Bain is a graduate of the University of Southern California and holds a Bachelor of Arts degree in Theater from the USC School of Dramatic Arts. Bain appeared in Playboy in 2002 and was named as one of Playboy Magazine's Rising Stars in 2008. Bain went on to perform as an actress on the NBC comedy series, The Real Wedding Crashers, Comedy Central's Mind of Mencia and alongside rockstar, Gene Simmons in a commercial promoting his television series, Gene Simmons Family Jewels. Bain then made guest appearances on The Tonight Show with Jay Leno and Real Time with Bill Maher.

Bain acted as a live-action character on Seth Green's Emmy Award-winning animated show Robot Chicken, which airs on the Cartoon Network's Adult Swim. She also voiced multiple characters for the 2009 Robot Chicken Christmas special.

Writer and director 

Robin Bain wrote, directed and produced the independent film, Girl Lost (film), which speaks on the harsh realities of sex trafficking in the United States. Girl Lost was released on Amazon Prime Video in May 2018. Bain released a second Girl Lost film as a writer, director, producer and editor entitled Girl Lost: A Hollywood Story. The film is part of Bain's continued effort to bring awareness to the pitfalls of the sex industry in Los Angeles. Girl Lost: A Hollywood Story was released on Amazon Prime Video on December 1, 2020. by Breaking Glass Pictures.

Bain directed the feature film, The Last Exorcist starring Danny Trejo and Rachele Brooke Smith in 2020. Bain is directing and producing the film Without You I'm Nothing, starring actor Dolph Lundgren in 2021.

Robin Bain is an advocate for female filmmakers and is a member of the Alliance of Women Directors. Bain is also an author for Ms. In The Biz, a website dedicated to female filmmakers. Bain often gears her writing toward controversial subjects regarding women in the film industry.

Personal life

Bain is skilled with firearms.
Bain's father served as a physician in the United States Army. She resides in Los Angeles, California.

Filmography

Awards and nominations

References

External links 

Robin Bain as a Guest Writer on "Ms. In The Biz"
Interview with filmmaker Robin Bain on "Film Courage"

1980 births
Living people
Screenwriters from Indiana
American television actresses
American women film directors
Film directors from Indiana
American film actresses
Female models from Indiana
People from Indiana
Actresses from Los Angeles
20th-century American actresses
21st-century American actresses
USC School of Dramatic Arts alumni
Screenwriters from California